Comtat is a comarca in the province of Alicante, Valencian Community, Spain.

Municipalities 

The comarca is composed of 24 municipalities, listed below with their areas and populations:

See also
Geography of Spain
List of Spanish cities

References

 
Comarques of the Valencian Community
Geography of the Province of Alicante